The Grace Family Vineyards is a vineyard and winery in Napa, California. It is widely regarded as one of the original cult wineries in the Napa Valley, and was the first American winery to use the word "family" in its name.

History

The winery began when Ann and Dick Grace planted  of vines in 1976. The first vintage was produced in 1978, at Chuck Wagner's winery, Caymus. A second acre was added in 1985, but phylloxera took its toll, as the winery's vines were planted on non-resistant rootstock. Additional problems with oak root fungus in the original acre caused the need to replant the entirety in 1995. The winery's yield dropped from 350 cases in the to a low of 48 cases in 1996, when the wine was allocated as one 1-liter bottle per customer on the winery's mailing list. Another acre of planting and re-planted vines in the old acreage brought production up to 150 cases in 1998.

Charity

The winery's mission statement is "Wine as a catalyst towards healing our planet." The programs of the Grace Family Vineyards Foundation are primarily in India, Nepal, Mexico, Tibet, and America.

Grace Family wines has been involved with the Naples Winter Wine Festival since its first year in 2001. In 2006, a 12-liter Balthazar of 2003 Grace Family Cabernet drew $90,000 ($ in  dollars) in bids at the festival's charity auction. For the 2012 charity auction, a Balthazar of both Grace Family and their second label, Blank, drew a $160,000 ($ in  dollars) bid.

Vineyard and winemaking
The Grace Family properties are organic and biodynamically farmed.

Gary Galleron was head winemaker between 1988 and 1995, when Heidi Peterson Barrett took over winemaking duties. Barrett, in turn, turned over duties to Gary Brookman. Helen Keplinger became winemaker in 2014 and continues to manage winegrowing at the estate alongside vineyard manager, Kendall Smith.

References

Wineries in Napa Valley
Companies based in Napa County, California